Martin Karapalevski (born 11 March 2000) is a Macedonian handball player who plays for RK Vardar 1961.

Honors
 Macedonian Handball Super League
 Winner:2021, 2022
 Macedonian Handball Cup
 Winner:2021, 2022

References

2000 births
Living people
Macedonian male handball players
Sportspeople from Bitola